The 2020–21 season was the 143rd season in the history of the English football club Wolverhampton Wanderers. The club competed in the Premier League for the third consecutive season and also participated in this season's edition of the FA Cup and EFL Cup.

The entire season took place against the backdrop of the global COVID-19 pandemic, which necessitated the players' compliance with strict restrictions on contact as well as a lack of fans at all Wolves' home matches until the final day of the campaign. The team also had to contend with several long-term injuries, including the leading goalscorer of the previous seasons, Raúl Jiménez, who suffered a fractured skull during an aerial collision in a 2–1 win at Arsenal on 29 November 2020.

With this victory, the team moved into 6th place in the table, but their results deteriorated afterward in Jiménez's absence for the remainder of the campaign and they eventually finished in 13th place, representing a decline compared to the previous two seventh-place finishes. Two days prior to the end of the league season, the club had announced that head coach Nuno Espírito Santo would be leaving by "mutual consent" after the final game following four years at the helm.

Competitions

Premier League

A total of 20 teams competed in the Premier League in the 2020–21 season. Each team played every other team twice, once at their stadium, and once at the opposition's. Three points were awarded to teams for each win, one point per draw, and none for defeats.

League table

Results summary

Results by matchday

Matches
The provisional fixture list was released on 20 August 2020, but was subject to change in the event of matches being selected for television coverage or police concerns.

FA Cup

The third round draw was made on 30 November, with Premier League and EFL Championship clubs all entering the competition. The draw for the fourth and fifth round were made on 11 January, conducted by Peter Crouch.

EFL Cup

As a Premier League team, Wolves entered the competition at the second round stage, which was drawn on 6 September.

EFL Trophy

Wolves were one of the sixteen teams from outside the bottom two divisions of the Football League to be invited to field their academy team in the competition due to it holding Category 1 academy status. They were drawn into Group F in the Northern section. Note: In group stage matches which were level at the end of 90 minutes, a penalty shoot-out was held, with the winner earning a bonus point.

Players

Statistics

|-
|align="left"|||align="left"|||align="left"|  
|||0||||0||0||0||style="background:#98FB98"|||0||1||0||
|-
|align="left"|||align="left"|||style="background:#faecc8; text-align:left;"|  ‡ 
|||1||||0||0||0||style="background:#98FB98"|||1||2||0||
|-
|align="left"|||align="left"|||align="left"|  
|||0||||0||0||0||style="background:#98FB98"|||0||2||0||
|-
|align="left"|||align="left"|||align="left"| 
|||5||||0||||0||||5||4||0||
|-
|align="left"|||align="left"|||align="left"|  
|||5||||0||||0||||5||7||0||
|-
|align="left"|||align="left"|||align="left"| 
|||4||||0||||0||||4||0||0||
|-
|align="left"|10||align="left"|||align="left"|  
|||3||||0||||0||||3||3||0||
|-
|align="left"|11||align="left"|||align="left"| 
|||0||||0||0||0||||0||1||0||
|-
|align="left"|12||align="left"|||style="background:#faecc8; text-align:left;"|  ‡
|||1||||0||0||0||style="background:#98FB98"|||1||0||0||
|-
|align="left"|15||align="left"|||align="left"|  
|||1||||0||||0||||1||2||0||
|-
|align="left"|16||align="left"|||align="left"| 
|||1||||0||||0||||1||6||0||
|-
|align="left"|17||align="left"|||align="left"| 
|||4||||0||||0||style="background:#98FB98"|||4||2||0||
|-
|align="left"|18||align="left"|||align="left"|  †
|||0||||0||0||0||||0||0||0||
|-
|align="left"|18||align="left"|||align="left"|  ¤
|||1||||0||0||0||||1||3||0||
|-
|align="left"|19||align="left"|||align="left"|  
|||0||||0||0||0||||0||0||0||
|-
|align="left"|20||align="left"|||style="background:#faecc8; text-align:left;"|  ‡
|||0||||1||||0||style="background:#98FB98"|||1||0||0||
|-
|align="left"|21||align="left"|||align="left"| 
|||0||||0||||0||||0||0||0||
|-
|align="left"|22||align="left"|||align="left"|  
|||1||||0||0||0||style="background:#98FB98"|||1||5||0||
|-
|align="left"|23||align="left"|||align="left"|  ¤ 
|||0||||0||0||0||||0||0||0||
|-
|align="left"|26||align="left"|||align="left"|  
|||0||||0||0||0||||0||0||0||
|-
|align="left"|27||align="left"|||align="left"| 
|||3||||0||||0||||3||2||0||
|-
|align="left"|28||align="left"|||align="left"| 
|||1||||0||0||0||||1||4||1||
|-
|align="left"|29||align="left"|||align="left"|  ¤
|||0||||0||||0||||0||0||0||
|-
|align="left"|32||align="left"|||align="left"| 
|||1||||0||||0||||1||4||0||
|-
|align="left"|37||align="left"|||align="left"| 
|||2||||1||||0||||3||5||0||
|-
|align="left"|38||align="left"|||align="left"|  ¤
|||0||||0||0||0||||0||0||0||
|-
|align="left"|39||align="left"|||align="left"| 
|||0||||0||0||0||||0||0||0||
|-
|align="left"|42||align="left"|||align="left"| 
|||0||||0||0||0||||0||0||0||
|-
|align="left"|49||align="left"|||align="left"|  
|||0||||0||0||0||||0||4||0||
|-
|align="left"|54||align="left"|||align="left"| 
|||0||||0||0||0||||0||1||0||
|-
|align="left"|57||align="left"|||align="left"| 
|||0||||0||0||0||||0||0||0||
|-
|align="left"|59||align="left"|||align="left"|  ¤
|||0||||0||||0||||0||0||0||
|-
|align="left"|60||align="left"|||align="left"| 
|||0||||0||0||0||style="background:#98FB98"|||0||0||0||
|-
|align="left"|62||align="left"|||align="left"| 
|||0||||0||0||0||||0||0||0||
|-
|align="left"|64||align="left"|||align="left"| 
|||0||||0||0||0||||0||0||0||
|-
|align="left"|75||align="left"|||align="left"| 
|||0||||0||0||0||||0||0||0||
|-
|}

Awards

Transfers

Transfers in

Loans in

New and extended contracts

Transfers out

Loans out

Notes

References

External links

Wolverhampton Wanderers F.C. seasons
Wolverhampton Wanderers F.C.